In mathematics, class field theory is the study of abelian extensions of local and global fields.

Timeline

 1801 Carl Friedrich Gauss proves the law of quadratic reciprocity
 1837 Dirichlet's theorem on arithmetic progressions.
 1853 Leopold Kronecker announces the Kronecker–Weber theorem
 1880 Kronecker introduces his Jugendtraum about abelian extensions of imaginary quadratic fields
 1886 Heinrich Martin Weber proves the Kronecker–Weber theorem (with a slight gap).
 1896 David Hilbert gives the first complete proof of the Kronecker–Weber theorem.
 1897 Weber introduces ray class groups and general ideal class groups.
 1897 Hilbert publishes his Zahlbericht.
 1897 Hilbert rewrites the law of quadratic reciprocity as a product formula for the Hilbert symbol. 
 1897 Kurt Hensel introduced p-adic numbers.
 1898 Hilbert conjectures the existence and properties of the (narrow) Hilbert class field, proving them in the special case of class number 2. 
 1907 Philipp Furtwängler proves existence and basic properties of the Hilbert class field.
 1908 Weber defines the class field of a general ideal class group.
 1920 Teiji Takagi shows that the abelian extensions of a number field are exactly the class fields of ideal class groups.
 1922 Takagi's paper on reciprocity laws
 1923 Helmut Hasse introduced the Hasse principle (for the special case of quadratic forms). 
 1923 Emil Artin conjectures his reciprocity law.
 1924 Artin introduces Artin L-functions.
 1926 Nikolai Chebotaryov proves his density theorem.
 1927 Artin proves his reciprocity law giving a canonical isomorphism between Galois groups and ideal class groups.
 1930 Furtwängler and Artin prove the principal ideal theorem.
 1930 Hasse introduces local class field theory.
 1931 Hasse proves the Hasse norm theorem.
 1931 Hasse classifies simple algebras over local fields.
 1931 Jacques Herbrand introduces the Herbrand quotient. 
 1931 The Albert–Brauer–Hasse–Noether theorem proves the Hasse principle for simple algebras over global fields.
 1933 Hasse classifies simple algebras over number fields.
 1934 Max Deuring and Emmy Noether develop class field theory using algebras.
 1936 Claude Chevalley introduces ideles.
 1940 Chevalley uses ideles to give an algebraic proof of the second inequality for abelian extensions.
 1948 Shianghao Wang proves the Grunwald–Wang theorem, correcting an error of Grunwald's. 
 1950 Tate's thesis uses analysis on adele rings to study zeta functions.
 1951 André Weil introduces Weil groups.
 1952 Artin and Tate introduce class formations in their notes on class field theory.
 1952 Gerhard Hochschild and Tadashi Nakayama introduce group cohomology into class field theory.
 1952 John Tate introduces Tate cohomology groups.
 1964 Evgeny Golod and Igor Shafarevich prove that the class field tower can be infinite.
 1965 Jonathan Lubin and Tate use Lubin–Tate formal group laws to construct ramified abelian extensions of local fields.

References

Fesenko, Ivan, Class field theory, its three main generalisations, and applications, EMS Surveys in Mathematical Sciences 2021
 

Class field theory
Mathematics timelines